Robert Coull (born 28 August 1966) is a British former cyclist. He competed in the team pursuit event at the 1988 Summer Olympics.

References

External links
 

1966 births
Living people
British male cyclists
Olympic cyclists of Great Britain
Cyclists at the 1988 Summer Olympics
Sportspeople from Rotherham
People from Rotherham